The Turner Memorial A.M.E. Church is an African Methodist Episcopal Church located in Hyattsville, Maryland. It is at 7201 16th Pl. Rev. Daryl K. Kearney is pastor. Pieces of the church's history will be preserved at Martin Luther King Jr. memorial Library in Washington D.C.

History

The congregation, one of America's historically black churches, was founded in 1915 by members of the Saint Paul African Methodist Episcopal Church in Southwest Washington who wished to organize an African Methodist Episcopal congregation in the neighborhood where they lived.  By the late 1940s, the congregation had outgrown the small building in which it met, and, after considering expansion plans, decided to purchase a synagogue building erected in 1908 by the Adas Israel Congregation, now known as the Sixth & I Historic Synagogue.  That location is slightly Northwest in what is now the Chinatown neighborhood.

On March 1, 2003, after 52 years in the building at Sixth and I, the congregation dedicated its new building in Hyattsville.

References

External links
Turner Memorial A.M.E. Church website

African-American history of Prince George's County, Maryland
African Methodist Episcopal churches in Maryland
Churches in Prince George's County, Maryland
Hyattsville, Maryland
Christian organizations established in 1919
1919 establishments in Maryland